The 2009 Sheikh Jassim Cup was the 31st edition of the league cup competition for football teams from Qatar.

Al-Arabi were the defending champions.

Round one groups 
12 clubs were drawn into 4 groups of 4 teams. The winners qualified for the semi-finals.

All group games were played in one 'host' location, instead of the common home and away format used in other competitions

Standings and results

Group A

Group B

Group C

Group D

Semi-finals

Final

2009–10 in Qatari football
2009 domestic association football cups